SBFC may refer to:

School-Based Family Counseling
Shepherd's Bush F.C.
Short Brothers F.C.
Sky Blue FC
Stevenage Borough F.C., now known as Stevenage F.C.
Solihull Borough F.C.
South Brisbane Football Club
South Bunbury Football Club